David Allen Langner (November 8, 1951 – April 26, 2014) was an American football player. He played college football at Auburn University and was a key player in "Punt Bama Punt". Langner was drafted by the Kansas City Chiefs in the 17th round of the 1974 NFL Draft, but did not have a career in the NFL.

Langner died of cancer at a hospice in Tuscaloosa, Alabama on April 26, 2014.

References

1951 births
2014 deaths
American football defensive backs
Auburn Tigers football players
Players of American football from Birmingham, Alabama
Deaths from cancer in Alabama